Yalquz Aghaj (also known as Yālqız Āghāj, Yalghiz Aghaj, Yālgız Āghāj, Yalkız-agach, Yālqìz Āqāch, and Yālqiz Āqāj) is a village in Yalquz Aghaj Rural District of Koshksaray District, Marand County, East Azerbaijan province, Iran. At the 2006 National Census, its population was 3,208 in 820 households. The following census in 2011 counted 3,431 people in 984 households. The latest census in 2016 showed a population of 3,537 people in 1,064 households; it is the center of the rural district.

References 

Marand County

Populated places in East Azerbaijan Province

Populated places in Marand County